Fernand Herrmann (21 February 1886 – April 1925) was a French silent film actor.

He starred in some 26 films between 1914 and 1925.

He appeared in films such as the Louis Feuillade-directed Les Vampires serial that ran in installments from 1915 to 1916, and Barabbas in 1920.

External links 

1886 births
1925 deaths
French male film actors
French male silent film actors
20th-century French male actors
Male actors from Paris